David Waterhouse may refer to:

David Waterhouse (Canadian football), see 1987 CFL Draft
David Waterhouse (MP) for Aldborough (UK Parliament constituency) and Berwick-upon-Tweed